Šarišské Bohdanovce is a village and municipality in Prešov District in the Prešov Region of eastern Slovakia.

History
In historical records the village was first mentioned in 1351.

Geography
The municipality lies at an altitude of 225 metres and covers an area of 9.36 km². It has a population of about 974 people.

References

External links
 http://www.sarisskebohdanovce.sk/

Villages and municipalities in Prešov District
Šariš